The Western Australia Party is a regional political party active in Western Australia. 

The party was founded in 2016 by Julie Matheson, a councillor with the City of Subiaco as Julie Matheson for Western Australia to contest the 2017 state election. In July 2017, the party's name was changed to the Western Australia Party.

The party's ideological focus is a combination of centrism, populism and regionalism, drawing from the position of Matheson and John Forrest. Its core policies include reform to Local Government, WA's Family Court, and tax reform.

History
Matheson unsuccessfully ran for the Australian Senate at the 2016 federal election as an independent candidate. Following her defeat, Matheson registered the Julie Matheson for Western Australia party in order to contest the 2017 Western Australian state election. The party received just 0.5% of first-preference votes in the Legislative Assembly, and 0.4% in the Legislative Council.

In 2017, the party rebranded as the "Western Australia Party", with the aim of contesting the next federal election on a platform advocating for Western Australia receiving more GST. The party was reported to have received financial support from a group of local businessmen, with retired barrister and judge Peter Nisbet serving as a spokesman and another retired barrister Bevan Lawrence serving on the party's steering committee; Matheson also remained involved. Nisbet stated that the party's "sole objective is to get a better deal with the GST and, secondly, a better share of defence contracts".

In the 2018 Cottesloe by-election the new party polled 9% of first preference votes, and 5.8% of first preference votes in the Darling Range by-election that same year.

As the party was not registered with the Australian Electoral Commission, Matheson contested the 2018 Perth by-election as an independent candidate. After the by-election, the party applied to be registered on a federal level. This registration was granted on 30 August 2018.

In 2019, the party contested its first federal election, running 20 candidates across Western Australia. However, the party again fared poorly, gaining only 1.8% in the House of Representatives and 1.2% in the Senate.

On 12 May 2020, the party gained its first member of parliament when former One Nation MP and Legislative Council member for East Metropolitan, Charles Smith, joined the party.

In August 2021 former Nationals MLC Dave Grills took over leadership of the party from Julie Matheson.

In 2022 former Liberal party member Anthony Fels announced he would be running in the North West Central for WAP.

Ideology and positions

The Western Australia Party has promoted itself as a centrist alternative to the major parties. Where decisions are made based on what's in the best interests of Western Australia as opposed to party ideology. As such the party has a wide array of political ideas with members coming from many other political parties.

The party's centrist image is reinforced through preferences. The party has always used a split-ticket system of preferencing, and at the 2019 Federal Election, the party's preferences were the most evenly split of any political party in Australia.

Throughout its history, the party has held policies to change taxation laws in Western Australia. Including a 100% per capita share of the G.S.T., removing payroll and capital gains tax, and the removal of fringe benefits tax. Further policies include reform to the Western Australian Family Court and Local Government Systems.

Election results
The Western Australia fielded 20 candidates in the 2019 Australian Federal Election, however none were elected.

Federal

Western Australia

References

Regionalist parties in Australia
Political parties in Western Australia
Political parties established in 2016
2016 establishments in Australia